Nicholas Alan Gehlfuss is an American actor, known for his role in 2014 as Robbie Pratt in the fourth season of the Showtime family comedy-drama Shameless. In 2015, he started starring as Dr. Will Halstead in the NBC medical drama Chicago Med.

Career
In 2014, Gehlfuss had a recurring role as Robbie Pratt in the fourth season of the Showtime family comedy-drama Shameless. In 2015, he guest-starred as Dr. Thomas Galen in the short-lived NBC horror drama Constantine in the penultimate episode "Angels and Ministers of Grace".

Later that year, Gehlfuss was cast in the NBC medical drama Chicago Med as Dr. Will Halstead. Halstead was first introduced in the police procedural drama Chicago P.D. and afterwards, the drama Chicago Fire's backdoor pilot for Chicago Med.

Personal life
Gehlfuss was born in Cleveland, Ohio and raised in Little Italy and Chesterland, Ohio. He holds a Bachelor of Fine Arts from Marietta College and completed his Master of Fine Arts at University of Missouri-Kansas City.

On May 13, 2016, Gehlfuss married hotel marketer Lilian Matsuda.

Filmography

Film

Television

References

External links

1985 births
American male television actors
21st-century American male actors
Male actors from Cleveland
Marietta College alumni
University of Missouri–Kansas City alumni
Living people
American male film actors